Frederick John Whitcroft (2 December 1882 – 9 August 1931) was a Canadian ice hockey player and coach. Whitcroft played for several notable amateur and early professional hockey squads, including the Renfrew Creamery Kings, Edmonton Eskimos and Kenora Thistles.

Hockey career
Early in his career, Whitcroft made a name for himself in hockey circles with his outstanding amateur play with the Peterborough Colts. In 1907 the Stanley Cup champion Kenora Thistles signed him to a $700 contract. While with the Thistles, the team defeated Brandon to retain the Stanley Cup. The club next played a challenge with the Montreal Wanderers. The Wanderers defeated the Thistles in a two game, total points series by the score of 12–8, avenging their loss to the Thistles earlier in the season.

The following year Whitcroft signed a contract to play with the Edmonton Eskimos of the Alberta Professional Hockey League. While with Edmonton, Whitcroft scored six goals in a game, five goals in a game three times and four times in a game once. Whitcroft led the league two years running in goals scored. Edmonton played in one Stanley Cup challenge in 1908, coming up against the Wanderers, losing 13-10 on goals in a two-game series.  After the Edmonton team disbanded in December 1909, Whitcroft jumped back east and signed with the National Hockey Association's Renfrew Creamery Kings for $2,000. Among his teammates were Hockey Hall of Famers Cyclone Taylor, Frank Patrick, Lester Patrick, and Newsy Lalonde, on a team dubbed the Renfrew Millionaires. After one season playing for the Millionaires, Whitcroft retired from playing. He coached the Edmonton Dominions to the Alberta championship in 1913–14.

Taking up gold prospecting after his hockey career was over, Whitcroft died of a heart attack in northern British Columbia in August, 1931. He was inducted into the Hockey Hall of Fame in 1962.

References
"Ireland Civil Registration Indexes, 1845-1958," database, FamilySearch (https://familysearch.org/ark:/61903/1:1:FB4H-ZPP : 10 March 2018), BIRTHS entry for Frederick John Whitcroft; citing Millford, Oct - Dec 1882, vol. 2, p. 227, General Registry, Custom House, Dublin; FHL microfilm 101,058.

Bibliography

Notes

External links

1882 births
1931 deaths
Canadian ice hockey forwards
Hockey Hall of Fame inductees
Ice hockey people from Ontario
Kenora Thistles players
People from the Regional District of Kitimat–Stikine
Renfrew Hockey Club players
Sportspeople from County Carlow
Stanley Cup champions
Canadian people of Irish descent